The Brazilian Submarine Force Command (ComForS), is the submarine force of the Brazilian Navy. The ComForS is one of the oldest commands of the Brazilian Armed Forces.

Mission 
The force's command mission is to ensure the readiness of subordinate means, establish rules and procedures and exercise operational control of submarines at sea and of diving activities in the Brazilian Navy, in order to contribute to the effectiveness of the employment of subordinate naval resources in the application of naval power.

History
The idea of a new weapon for naval warfare was developed in the late 19th century. The first plans to the force of submarines, was created by the First Lieutenant Felinto Perry, his works published in periodicals at the time, were reason for reflection and wide discussion, arousing public interest and motivating the Senior Naval Administration. At that time, Lieutenant Perry highlighted the value of the submarine in the defense of the sovereignty of the state: "I hope to see the operation of this unquestionably powerful weapon in your Navy, a very important factor in defense of maritime borders.”

In 1904, the Minister of Naval Affairs, Admiral Julio César de Noronha, included three submersibles in the Naval Construction Program. The epilogue of the submersible acquisition campaign for the Brazilian Navy and the beginning of the history of this new category of ships came to fruition in 1911, when the Minister of the Navy, Vice-Admiral Joaquim Marques Baptista de Leão, created a Naval Commission in La Spezia, to supervise the construction of three Italian Foca-class submarines ordered by the government. The first submarine of Brazil called F-1 was launched on 11 December 1913. The ComForS was created in 1914 starting the submarine era in Brazil.

New base

In 2020, the Navy inaugurated the Madeira Island Submarine Base, with the objective of anchor the new Scorpénes, as well the future Brazilian nuclear submarine fleet. The facility is also the base for other Navy boats, such as the Type 209 submarines, for modernization and inspections. In July 2021, the Navy officially transferred the ComForS to the base.

Future nuclear fleet
From 2018, the Navy through the Itaguaí Construções Navais, begin the construction of the first Brazilian nuclear submarine (SSN) Álvaro Alberto. The boat is the first of a fleet of six units planned by the ComForS for 2040s.

Current fleet
Current submarine and rescue fleet:

See also

Brazilian Armed Forces
Future of the Brazilian Navy
Submarine Development Program

References

External links 
 ComForS website (in Portuguese only)
 Brazilian Navy website (in Portuguese only)

Brazilian Navy
Commands of the Brazilian Armed Forces